Haplochromis graueri is a species of cichlid endemic to Lake Kivu on the border of the Democratic Republic of the Congo, and Rwanda.  This species can reach a length of  SL.

References

graueri
Fish described in 1914
Taxonomy articles created by Polbot